The UCSB Center for Spatial Studies (spatial@ucsb) is a research center at the University of California, Santa Barbara. The center was founded in 2008 by Michael Goodchild, and focuses on spatial thinking across domains, spatial intelligence, geoinformatics, geographic information science, and geographic information systems. The center is currently directed by Krzysztof Janowicz, Professor for Geoinformatics. It was previously directed by Werner Kuhn. With its multidisciplinary focus, the center hosts speakers, workshops, visiting researchers, and offers an academic Minor in Spatial Studies. The center's mission is to engage in interdisciplinary research and education in how people and technology solve spatial problems and how spatial thinking can be applied to address problems in a wide variety of application domains and research fields. Under Janowicz's directorship, the center put a new focus on spatial data science, knowledge graphs, and on technology transfer to the industry more broadly.

The center is affiliated with the National Center for Geographic Information and Analysis and maintains TeachSpatial, a set of educational resources for spatial thinking.

List of directors
 Michael Goodchild (2008-2012)
 Werner Kuhn (2012-2020)
 Krzysztof Janowicz (2020-)

References

Further reading

External links
Official website: http://spatial.ucsb.edu 
Spatial Archives: http://spatial.ucsb.edu/spatial-archives
TeachSpatial: http://teachspatial.org

University of California, Santa Barbara buildings and structures
Non-profit organizations based in California
Research institutes in California
Geographic data and information organizations in the United States